The 22915 / 22916 Bandra Terminus–Hisar Superfast Express is a Superfast Express belonging to Indian Railways that runs between  and  in India.

It operates as train number 22915 from Bandra Terminus to Hisar Junction and as train number 22916 in the reverse direction.

Coaches

The train has standard ICF rakes with a max speed of 110 kmph. The train consists of 19 coaches:

 2 AC II Tier
 4 AC III Tier
 8 Sleeper coaches
 2 General Unreserved
 1 Seating cum Luggage Rake
 1 End on Generator 

As with most train services in India, coach composition may be amended at the discretion of Indian Railways depending on demand.

Service

22915  Bandra Terminus–Hisar Superfast Express covers the distance of 1407 kilometres in 24 hours 35 mins (57 km/hr) & 1407 kilometres in 25 hours 00 mins (56 km/hr) as 22916 Hisar–Bandra Terminus Superfast Express.

As the average speed of the train is above 55 km/hr, as per Indian Railways rules, its fare includes a Superfast Express surcharge.

Route and halts

The important halts of the train are:

Schedule

Rake sharing

The train shares its rake with 19061/19062 Bandra Terminus–Ramnagar Express

Traction

A Vadodara-based WAP-7 locomotive hauls the train from Bandra Terminus to  handing over to a Vatva-based WDM-3A / WDM-3D locomotive until Hisar Junction.

References

Transport in Mumbai
Transport in Hisar (city)
Express trains in India
Rail transport in Maharashtra
Rail transport in Gujarat
Rail transport in Rajasthan
Rail transport in Haryana
Railway services introduced in 2014